Forest Gate Community School is a coeducational secondary school in the London Borough of Newham, rated Outstanding by Ofsted in February 2020 for the second time. It was first rated Outstanding in 2016. The school was extended from eight forms of entry to ten – rising to a total of 1,350 pupils – starting with the Year 7 admission in September 2019 to meet demand from local parents attributed to the school’s much-improved reputation. The school was ranked in the top 50 in the country for progress in GCSE results in 2016, 2017, 2018, 2019 and 2020. In 2017, disadvantaged students made progress over 1 grade higher than the national average, source Department for Education. The school was ranked 33rd in the country for progress scores for disadvantaged students in 2019. The school has the best progress 8 for Newham for secondary students for 2018 and 2019. In 2020, the school was named School of the Year by World Class Schools.

History 
The school was built by architects Colquhoun and Miller in 1965 to replace Whitehall Place School Senior Mixed School.

It was opened in February 1966 by The Right Honourable Sir F. Elwyn Jones, who was the Labour MP for West Ham South at the time.

It was originally called Forest Gate County High School.

Previously a community school administered by Newham London Borough Council, in October 2016 Forest Gate Community School converted to academy status. The school is now sponsored by the Community Schools Trust, the CEO of which is former headteacher Simon Elliott.

Since conversion to academy status, the school has seen three further headteachers, including Charlotte Whelan, Thahmina Begum, and Shuabur Rahman.

Awards and nominations 
The TES English Department of the Year, 2020 - WON
World Class Schools status, 2017 - ACCREDITATION
The Chartered Institute of Assessors, 2017 - ACCREDITATION
The Evening Standard outstanding achievement in challenging circumstances award, 2017 - WON
The TES secondary school of the year, 2017 - NOMINATED
The National Association for Able Children in Education (NACE) Challenge Award, 2016 - ACCREDITATION
World Class Schools Quality Mark School of the Year, 2020 - WON

Remodelling 
The school had a £15m remodelling in 2011, as part of the London Borough of Newham’s Building Schools for the Future Programme.

This included the introduction of a new four court sports hall, an open plan breakout space and a new passenger lift and staircase.

The school also has an on-site fitness suite/gym, including separate facilities for muscular and cardio workouts. It is open to the public outside of school hours.

Coinciding with its expansion to ten forms of entry, the school underwent further redevelopment to be completed for the beginning of the 2020-21 academic year. This included a new 3G pitch, amenities deck, dining hall, classrooms, and a multi-use games area.

Scholarship Programme 
Since September 2013, the school have run a scholarship programme, called the Prestigious Colleges programme, helping very bright pupils win places at top independent schools.

In February 2014, Ishak Ayiris and Irfan Badshah became the first students to be accepted on scholarships, winning places at Eton and Winchester College, respectively. In 2017, Kaashif Kamaly became the second student to win a scholarship at Eton. In 2018, two students won scholarships to City of London School, while Sara Chowdhury became the first girl from FGCS to win a scholarship. In 2021, four students won scholarships - including two to City of London School. In 2022, students won scholarships to Eton College and Westminster School.

Structure and Admissions 
The school maintains an open admissions policy. It is the founder member of the Community Schools Trust which also includes Waterside Academy and Cumberland Community School.

References 

Secondary schools in the London Borough of Newham
Academies in the London Borough of Newham
Forest Gate
Educational institutions established in 1966